Bagha Shad was a Göktürk shad or general of the early 7th century CE. He was a close kinsman and subject of the Western Göktürk khagan, Tong Yabghu. Bagha Shad was probably the father of Böri Shad and may have been the yabghu or prince of the Khazars.

He is referred to in Chinese sources as having sojourned in China in 618–626, possibly as Tong Yabghu's emissary to the Tang emperor. Thereafter he disappears from the historical record.

References

Artamonov, Mikhail. Istoriya Khazar. Leningrad, 1962.
Christian, David. A History of Russia, Mongolia and Central Asia. Blackwell, 1999.
Golden, Peter Benjamin. Introduction to the History of the Turkic Peoples. Wiesbaden: Harrasowitz, 1992.
Gumilev, Lev. The Gokturks, 1st ed. Moscow: Nauka, 1967.
Pletneva, Svetlana. Khazary, 2nd ed. Moscow: Nauka, 1986.

Göktürk khagans
7th-century Turkic people
Ashina house of the Turkic Empire